Jan Vošahlík (born 8 March 1989) is a Czech professional footballer who plays as a winger or forward for Austrian club SV Gaflenz.

References

External links
 
 Profile at iDNES.cz
 
 Jan Vošahlík at ÖFB

1989 births
Living people
Czech footballers
Czech expatriate footballers
Czech Republic youth international footballers
Czech Republic under-21 international footballers
Czech First League players
Nemzeti Bajnokság I players
Kazakhstan Premier League players
FK Jablonec players
FK Čáslav players
FK Bohemians Prague (Střížkov) players
SK Slavia Prague players
SK Dynamo České Budějovice players
FC Shakhter Karagandy players
1. FK Příbram players
Mezőkövesdi SE footballers
FK Teplice players
1. SK Prostějov players
Kavala F.C. players
Association football forwards
Sportspeople from Příbram
Czech expatriate sportspeople in Kazakhstan
Czech expatriate sportspeople in Hungary
Czech expatriate sportspeople in Greece
Czech expatriate sportspeople in Austria
Expatriate footballers in Kazakhstan
Expatriate footballers in Hungary
Expatriate footballers in Greece
Expatriate footballers in Austria